Light Street may refer to a portion of Maryland Route 2 in Baltimore, Maryland.

Light Street may also refer to:
Light Street, George Town, Penang, Malaysia
Lightstreet, Pennsylvania, an unincorporated community